Henry Peart (born 1889) was an English professional footballer who played as a centre half.

Career
Born in Newcastle, Peart joined Bradford City from Strathclyde in June 1909. He made 13 league and 1 FA Cup appearances for the club, before moving to Leeds City in September 1913. He later played for Blyth Spartans.

Sources

References

1889 births
Year of death missing
English footballers
Strathclyde F.C. players
Bradford City A.F.C. players
Leeds City F.C. players
Blyth Spartans A.F.C. players
English Football League players
Association football defenders